In enzymology, a rosmarinate synthase is an enzyme that catalyzes the chemical reaction

caffeoyl-CoA + 3-(3,4-dihydroxyphenyl)lactate  CoA + rosmarinate

Thus, the two substrates of this enzyme are caffeoyl-CoA and 3-(3,4-dihydroxyphenyl)lactate, whereas its two products are CoA and rosmarinate.

This enzyme belongs to the family of transferases, specifically those acyltransferases transferring groups other than aminoacyl groups.  The systematic name of this enzyme class is caffeoyl-CoA:3-(3,4-dihydroxyphenyl)lactate 2'-O-caffeoyl-transferase. Other names in common use include rosmarinic acid synthase, caffeoyl-coenzyme A:3,4-dihydroxyphenyllactic acid, caffeoyltransferase, and 4-coumaroyl-CoA:4-hydroxyphenyllactic acid 4-coumaroyl transferase.  This enzyme participates in tyrosine metabolism.

References

 

EC 2.3.1
Enzymes of unknown structure
Hydroxycinnamic acids metabolism